Billbraya is a genus of parasitic alveolates in the phylum Apicomplexia. It contains a single recognised species, Billbraya australis.

Description

This genus was described in 1990 by Paperna and Landau. The genus is named after the parasitologist Robert ("Bill") Bray.

While merogony mostly occurs in the erythrocytes (typically 2 parasites per cell and up to 95% infection rates) it may also occur in the monocytes.

Gametocytes occur in the erythrocytes and may persist for months.

Host range

The only known host for this species is the  marbled gecko (Phyllodactylus marmoratus).

Geographical range

This parasite is found in Australia.

References

Apicomplexa genera
Haemosporida